Zaina is a surname. Notable people with the surname include:

Enrico Zaina (born 1967), Italian road bicycle racer
Ionuț Zaina (born 1994), Romanian footballer

See also
Zaina (given name)

Zana, Pebbles and Rowan of Rin Rule